Ercole Spada (born 26 July 1937 in Busto Arsizio) is an Italian automobile designer. His most notable designs were produced in the 1960s, for the Zagato design studio house, where Spada was chief stylist. During this period some of the most notable sports cars by Aston Martin, Ferrari, Maserati, as well as Alfa Romeo, Abarth, Fiat and Lancia were clothed by Spada's designs.

Background and early days
Spada earned a degree in industrial engineering from Istituto Tecnico Feltrinelli in 1956. Following a military service, he joined Zagato in February 1960.

The first design created by Spada for Zagato was the Aston Martin DB4 GT Zagato. Many avant-garde yet instantly-classic designs followed, soon becoming cornerstones of automotive design. Spada's designs were acknowledged as seminal by his fellow designers as well as by generations of new designers. One example of the attraction of Spada's work was the Mazda MX-3, which aimed to capture the magic of the Alfa Romeo Giulia TZ design, according to its creators. Shortly before leaving Zagato, Spada designed one of the most modern looking cars of the era, the Alfa Romeo Junior Z, as well as the popular and dramatic Lancia Fulvia Sport.

Spada joined Ford in 1970 to become chief designer at the Italian Ghia design house. This led to the creation of the ill-fated Ford GT70, which did not enter production at the last moment.

BMW 
After leaving Ford and following a short stay at Audi, Spada joined BMW's design center as chief stylist in 1976. During his stay with BMW, Spada created two major all-new designs with Claus Luthe, the 7-series (1986–1994), and the BMW E34 5-series (1988–1996). Both embraced similar classic yet progressive lines, contributing to the success of the German company.

I.DE.A
In 1983 Spada returned to lead an Italian design house, this time I.DE.A Institute, where he designed a string of compact and luxury cars, for Fiat – the groundbreaking Tipo and Tempra siblings, the Lancia Dedra and Delta II, and the Kappa. Other projects included the Alfa Romeo 155 and the Daihatsu Move. During his stay in I.DE.A Institute, Spada competed and won over major design contracts from Fiat, putting him in direct competition with his fellow Italian designer, Giorgetto Giugiaro.

Zagato
Returning to Zagato in 1992, Spada brought with him new creative energy, which led to the introduction of the Ferrari FZ93, based on a regular 512 TR mechanics, as well as other notable designs.

Spadaconcept
Spada continues to work as a designer. He has joined his son, Paulo Spada, to create Spadaconcept, a new design house aimed at automotive and industrial design.

Notable designs

 1960 Aston Martin DB4 GT Zagato
 1960 Alfa Romeo Giulietta SZ
 1960 O.S.C.A 1600 GTZ
 1960 Alfa Romeo Giulietta SZ2 Coda Tronca
 1962 Alfa Romeo 2600 SZ
 1962 Lancia Flavia Sport
 1963 Alfa Romeo Giulia TZ
 1963 Lancia Flaminia Super Sport
 1964 Alfa Romeo Giulia TZ2
 1965 Lancia Fulvia Sport
 1967 Lancia Flavia Super Sport
 1967 Rover 2000 TCZ
 1969 Alfa Romeo Junior Z
 1969 Volvo GTZ
 1970 Volvo GTZ 3000
 1970 Ford GT70
 1972 Iso Varedo
 1973 Alfa Romeo Scarabeo II
 1987 BMW 7 Series (E32)
 1988 BMW 5 Series (E34)
 1988 Ferrari PPG Indy Pace Car
 1988 Fiat Tipo
 1989 Lancia Dedra
 1990 Fiat Tempra
 1992 Alfa Romeo 155
 1993 Ferrari FZ93, renamed ES1
 1993 Lancia Delta II
 1993 Nissan Terrano II
 1994 Lancia Kappa
 2001 OSCA 2500 GT Dromos
 2008 Spada Codatronca

References

Sources 
 Ercole Spada himself
 ERCOLE SPADA – 40 Years Devoted to Car Design, Car Styling Magazine, Volume 131 (July 1999)
 Penny Sparke, A Century of Car Design (2002)
 Paolo Tumminelli, Car Design (2004)
 Robert Edwards Aston Martin: Ever the Thoroughbred (2003)
 Michele Marchianò, Le Zagato – Fulvia Sport / Junior Z (2005)
 Carlo Stella and Bruno Vettore, Zagato Fulvia Sport Competizione (2003)
 Hilton Holloway and Martin Buckley, A–Z of Cars (2002)
 Winston Scott Goodfellow, Iso Rivolta: The Men, the Machines (2001)
 https://web.archive.org/web/20070927005823/http://www.austin-rover.co.uk/index.htm?zagatoprotof.htm
 https://web.archive.org/web/20070205081715/http://www.lanciaflavia.it/archivio_carrozzieri/zagato.php
 http://www.classicdriver.com/uk/magazine/3300.asp?id=13351

External links
https://web.archive.org/web/20070304085206/http://www.spadaconcept.com/
Coachbuild.com encyclopedia: Spadaconcept
http://www.zagato.it/
http://www.zagato-cars.com/
https://web.archive.org/web/20080414182755/http://www.idea.institute.it/eng/
https://web.archive.org/web/20080216075052/http://www.conceptcars.it/stilisti/spada.htm
https://www.webcitation.org/6CN8mVEjO?url=http://www.bmwism.com/bmws_designers.htm Ercole Spada on the page BMW Designers

Italian automobile designers
1937 births
Living people
BMW designers
People from Busto Arsizio